The following lists events that happened during 1974 in South Africa.

Incumbents
 State President: Jim Fouché.
 Prime Minister: John Vorster.
 Chief Justice: Newton Ogilvie Thompson then Frans Lourens Herman Rumpff.

Events

January
 4 – Harry Schwarz and Chief Minister of KwaZulu Gatsha Buthelezi sign the Mahlabatini Declaration of Faith.
 11 – David, Elizabeth, Emma, Grant, Jason and Nicolette Rosenkowitz are born in Cape Town, the first sextuplets in the world where all six babies survive.

March
 18 – Members of the World Council of Churches's Executive or Central Committee are banned from South Africa.
 19 – The Narcotics Bureau of the South African Police is established.
 19 – Harry Schwarz and Chief Minister Cedric Phatudi of Lebowa sign the Seshego Declaration.

April
 24 – A whites only general election takes place and is won by the National Party.
 25 – A coup in Portugal leads to that country's withdrawal from its colonies in Angola and Mozambique.

May
 29 – Prime Minister of South Africa John Vorster and Prime Minister of Rhodesia Ian Smith meet and agree to co-operative co-existence with and non-interference in the internal affairs of a black-ruled Mozambique.

June
 5 – The Japanese government announces that South Africans will no longer be granted visas to enter Japan.

July
 7 – New Zealand imposes a blanket ban on sports teams from South Africa.

September
 22–23 – Prime Minister of South Africa John Vorster and President of Côte d'Ivoire Félix Houphouët-Boigny hold talks.

October
 25 – Pik Botha declares at the United Nations that South Africa is beginning to make far-reaching reforms.

November
 12 – The United Nations General Assembly suspends South Africa from participating in its work, due to international opposition to the policy of apartheid. South Africa was re-admitted to the UN in 1994 following its transition into a democracy.
 26 – Anneline Kriel is crowned as Miss World 1974, the second South African to hold the title after Penny Coelen in 1958, when Helen Morgan resigns four days after winning the 24th Miss World pageant.

Unknown date
 The Sishen-Saldanha iron ore line is opened.

Births
 4 January – Sindi Dlathu, actress
 2 February – André Snyman, rugby player
 7 February – Steve Nash, South African-born Canadian basketball player
 23 February – Herschelle Gibbs, cricketer
 23 February – Robbi Kempson, rugby player
 5 March – Megan Hall, triathlete
 14 March – Mark Fish, soccer player
 15 March – Percy Montgomery, Springbok rugby player
 16 March – Brian Baloyi, soccer player
 27 March – George Koumantarakis, football player
 29 March – Basetsana Kumalo, first runner-up in Miss World 1994, businesswoman, tv personality
 13 April – K. Sello Duiker, novelist (d. 2005)
 21 April – Tony Kgoroge, actor
 21 April – Mandla Mandela,  chief of the Mvezo Traditional Council and the grandson of Nelson Mandela
 26 April – Louise Barnes, actress
 11 June – Ricardo Loubscher, rugby player
 22 June – Alfred Phiri, soccer player
 26 June – Cyril Nzama, soccer player
 29 June – Judith Sephuma, singer
 30 June – Hezekiél Sepeng, middle-distance athlete
 11 July – Michelle Claire Edwards, badminton player
 17 July – Linda Sibiya, radio, television personality and motivational speaker
 26 September – Ninja (Die Antwoord), recording artist, rapper, record producer and actor
 27 October – Thabo Mooki, soccer player
 8 November – Penny Heyns, breast-stroke swimmer
 17 December – Charl Langeveldt, cricketer

Deaths
 1 February – Abram Onkgopotse Tiro, militant student leader. (b. 1947)
 2 February – Thomas Sturgess, an Indian cricketer, dies in Cape Town (b. 1898)
 22 March – Peter Revson, American race car driver, died in pre-race crash at the South African Grand Prix in Midrand. (b. 1939)
 3 April – Ossie Newton-Thompson, cricketer and politician. (b. 1920)
 20 May – Leontine Sagan, director and actress. (b. 1889)
 28 May – Matthew Frew, Air Vice Marshal of the South African Air Force, died in Pretoria. (b. 1895)

Railways

Locomotives
 Three new Cape gauge locomotive types enter service on the South African Railways:
 The first of one hundred , Series 5 electric locomotives.
 November – The first of 150 Class 35-200 General Motors Electro-Motive Division (GM-EMD) type GT18MC diesel-electric locomotives.
 December – The first of 100 Class 34-600 GM-EMD type GT26MC diesel-electric locomotives.
 ISCOR places the first of forty-four Class 34-500 General Electric type U26C diesel-electric locomotives in service on the Sishen-Saldanha iron ore line.

Sports
 6 May – The British and Irish Lions begin a controversial twenty-two match rugby union tour of South Africa and Rhodesia.

References

South Africa
Years in South Africa
History of South Africa